Tropidophis stejnegeri, also known commonly as Stejneger's dwarf boa and the Jamaican eyespot trope, is a small species of snake in the family Tropidophiidae (dwarf boas). The species is endemic to the northern half of Jamaica.

Etymology
The specific name, stejnegeri, is in honor of Norwegian-born, American herpetologist Leonhard Stejneger.

Geographic range
T. stejnegeri is found in the northern half of Jamaica, typically from Montego Bay, Mt. Horeb, and Plum Park, St. James Parish, and Bluefields, Westmoreland Parish, in the west, to the type locality in the east, and also at Balaclava in northern St. Elizabeth Parish. The type locality is "Boston Bay, Portland Parish, Jamaica".

Description
T. stejnegeri is distinguished from other Tropidophis species by its bright-colored body and tail.

Habitat and ecology
This species, T. stejnegeri, is from dry, moist and wet habitats, found under vegetation debris and in bromeliads on the ground or low in trees, and is active at night.

Reproduction
T. stejnegeri is known to reproduce by viviparity.

Threats
Threats to the species T. stejnegeri include tourism development and urbanization along the coast, bauxite mining in the Cockpit Country, agricultural development and, presumably, predation by the small Indian mongoose (Urva auropunctata) and feral cats throughout the species' range.

Conservation
The family Tropidophiidae is included in Appendix II of the Convention on International Trade in Endangered Species of Wild Fauna and Flora. The species T. stejnegeri occurs in a number of Forest Reserves, but these are not effectively managed to prevent ongoing deforestation, and so improving site management is important for the species, as is invasive species control. This species is listed as Near Threatened on the basis that it has an extent of occurrence of approximately 6,000 sq km (2,317 sq mi) and there is a continuing decline in the extent and quality of its habitat, however, it does not quite qualify for listing as Vulnerable under criterion B on the basis that the population is not thought to be severely fragmented and the species is not thought to occur at fewer than 10 locations.

References

Further reading
Grant C (1940). "Notes on the Reptiles and Amphibians of Jamaica, with Diagnoses of New Species and Subspecies". Jamaica Today 15: 151–157. (Tropidophis pardalis stejnegeri, new subspecies).
Schwartz A, Henderson RW (1991). Amphibians and Reptiles of the West Indies: Descriptions, Distributions, and Natural History. Gainesville: University of Florida Press. 720 pp. . (Tropidophis haetianus stejnegeri, p. 637).
Schwartz A, Thomas R (1975). A Check-list of West Indian Amphibians and Reptiles. Carnegie Museum of Natural History Special Publication No. 1. Pittsburgh, Pennsylvania: Carnegie Museum of Natural History. 216 p. (Tropidophis haetianus stejnegeri, p. 193).

Tropidophiidae
Snakes of the Caribbean
Reptiles described in 1940